Sir Valentine Fleming  (13 November 180925 October 1884) was an English Australian judge, Solicitor-General, Attorney-General and public servant, who was Chief Justice of Van Diemen's Land (now Tasmania)

Biography
Fleming was born in Ashby-de-la-Zouch, Leicestershire, England, the second son of Captain Valentine Fleming of Tuam, County Galway and his wife Catherine, a daughter of John Hunter Gowan II. Fleming was educated at Bangor and Trinity College, Dublin, graduating with honours in 1834. He was called to the bar at Gray's Inn on 21 January 1838.

In 1841 Fleming was appointed commissioner of insolvent debtors, Hobart Town, Van Diemen's Land. He became Solicitor-General in 1844, Attorney-General in 1848, an official member of the Legislative Council in 1851 and Chief Justice of the Supreme Court of Van Diemen's Land in 1854. He was knighted in 1856 and retired on a pension of £1000 a year at the end of 1869, but was acting Chief Justice in the absence from Tasmania of his successor from 1872 to 1874. From March to May 1874 Fleming administered the Tasmanian government.

He built a home in Hobart in 1846 that was subsequently occupied by Sir William Lambert Dobson, Chief Justice 1885-1898.

He died near Reigate, England on 25 October 1884. He married twice: once to Elizabeth Oke, daughter of Charles Buckland, and second to Fanny Maria, daughter of William Seccombe, who survived him.

References
 
M. Gibson, 'Fleming, Sir Valentine (1809–1884)', Australian Dictionary of Biography, Volume 4, MUP, 1972, pp 187–188. Retrieved 21 October 2008.

Additional sources listed by the Australian Dictionary of Biography:
L. F. S. Hore, Digest of Cases Decided in Tasmania, 1856–1896 (Hobart, 1897); W. A. Townsley, The Struggle for Self-Government in Tasmania 1842–1856 (Hobart, 1951); Times (London), 28 Oct 1884; GO 1/95/21, 33/79/404, 33/81/24.
 

Chief Justices of Tasmania
Judges of the Supreme Court of Tasmania
Solicitors-General of Tasmania
Attorneys-General of Tasmania
1809 births
1884 deaths
People from Ashby-de-la-Zouch
Members of Gray's Inn
Colony of Tasmania judges
Van Diemen's Land judges
19th-century Australian judges
Australian King's Counsel
19th-century Australian politicians